Anthony Craig "Ack" Kinmonth is an Australian film and television composer. He was the first Australian composer to write a featured song for the American children's television series, Sesame Street: "Five Kangaroos". It aired during the show's 44th season as performed by Australian R&B singer, Jessica Mauboy. Australasian Performing Right Association reporter described it as a "catchy Australian tune" in March 2014. Kinmonth wrote a second song for the program, "Farm Animal Song (1-10 Hoedown)", which aired during its 45th season and was performed by Kinmonth and voice over artist, Kate Murphy.

In 2012 he composed the music for Tender, a short comedy film, produced by Liz Tomkins for QPIX. Kinmonth was the music and sound designer for The Cube Globe, a digital interactive learning and display space created by the Queensland University of Technology (QUT) for the 2014 G20 Leaders Summit held in Brisbane.

Kinmonth was the composer for the TV miniseries, Texas Rising: The Lost Soldier (2015). He also served as the music editor and composer of additional music for Vikings: Athelstan’s Journal. Both miniseries were distributed by the History Channel.

Awards 

Kinmonth was the recipient of two Bronze Medals at the 2014 Brisbane Advertising and Design Club (BADC) Awards for his compositional work on a documentary series about HIV awareness for the HIV Foundation Queensland.

Filmography 

 Tender – composer (2012)
 Limbo – Composer, Sound Editor (2013)
 Factory hands – Composer (2014)
 Resonance - Composer (2015)
 Texas Rising: The Lost Soldier - Composer (2015) 
 Vikings: Athelstan’s Journal – Composer (additional music), Music Editor (2015)
The Wishmas Tree - Composer (2019)
Combat Wombat (film) - Composer (2020)
Daisy Quokka: World's Scariest Animal - Composer (2020)
 Christmas on the Farm - Composer (2021)

Soundtrack 

 Sesame Street – "Five Kangaroos" – Writer (March 2014)
 Another Country – "Fuse" – Writer, Performer (2015)
 Sesame Street – "Farm Animal Song!" – Writer (2015)

References 

Australian composers
Living people
Year of birth missing (living people)